Maud Elisabet Nordlander (born 11 November 1943) is a Swedish curler.

In 1977 she was inducted into the Swedish Curling Hall of Fame.

Teams

References

External links
 

Living people
1943 births
Swedish female curlers
Swedish curling champions